Nancy Logan Haigwood is an American scientist. She is a professor and the director of the Oregon National Primate Research Center. Haigwood is an HIV/AIDS researcher and serves as a volunteer board member on the Cascade AIDS Project. She is an advocate of science education and outreach.

Education 
Haigwood earned a doctor of philosophy at University of North Carolina at Chapel Hill in 1980. She was the graduate mentor to the Kappa Kappa Gamma chapter at Chapel Hill. Her dissertation was titled The organization of repetitive sequences in two cloned mouse beta-globin clusters. Haigwood completed a postdoctoral fellowship at Johns Hopkins University from 1979 to 1981.

Career 
Haigwood worked for 17 years in the biotechnology and pharmaceutical industry. A large portion of this was at the Chiron Corporation (Novartis) and the Bristol-Myers Squibb Pharmaceutical Research Institute.  She was a professor of microbiology and pathology from 1997 to 2007 at the University of Washington and a member of the Center for Global Infectious Disease Research. In 2007, she became the fifth director of the Oregon National Primate Research Center. She is a volunteer board member of the Cascade AIDS Project and an advocate for science education and outreach. Haigwood has researched HIV/AIDS with an emphasis in preventing mother to child transmission and on vaccines since 1986.

Awards and honors 
Haigwood is a Fellow of the American Society for Microbiology. She won the Cascade AIDS Project 2017 Action Award for her "outstanding volunteer service to this AIDS service organization."

Personal life 
Haigwood contacted the Federal Bureau of Investigation in early 2002 after she had suspicions that Bruce Edwards Ivins was behind the 2001 anthrax attacks.

References

External links 

 

Living people
Year of birth missing (living people)
University of North Carolina at Chapel Hill alumni
Oregon Health & Science University faculty
20th-century American scientists
21st-century American scientists
21st-century American women scientists
20th-century American women scientists
HIV/AIDS researchers
American women academics